Wanda Nara (born 10 December 1986) is an Argentine model and football agent.

Early life and career
Nara was born on 10 December 1986 in Boulogne Sur Mer, Buenos Aires, to Andrés Nara and Nora Colosimo. She has a younger sister, Zaira.

Career

Nara officially debuted on stage as a second vedette in the summer theatre season of 2005–2006 in the revue Humor en custodia. In the summer theatre season of 2006–2007, Nara was a vedette in the revue King Corona by Jorge Corona. She left the revue after two months due to alleged abuse from the comedian and his wife. Nara, after the scandal (which gave her much notoriety in the gossip magazines), signed a contract with Showmatch's Patinando por un sueño, aired in August–December 2007, as contestant and soubrette. In late 2009 she participated in El musical de tus sueños as a contestant archiving success, and in May 2011 she became contestant in Bailando 2011, a contest Nara left to go to Italy with her then-husband Maxi López, and was replaced by her sister Zaira.

Nara, in September 2018, replaced Melissa Satta as co-presenter, showgirl and opinionist in Tiki Taka - Il calcio è il nostro gioco, the sports talk show of Mediaset aired in the late night slot and hosted by Pierluigi Pardo. The program was aired in 2018, and also in 2020, on Italia 1, and aired in 2019 on Canale 5. The roles of Nara and Pardo in this program ended in March 2020 due to the COVID-19 pandemic and in the next season (aired from September 2020 on Italia 1) they were replaced by Piero Chiambretti. In early 2020 Nara took part in the fourth season of Grande Fratello VIP (hosted by Alfonso Signorini and aired on Canale 5) as opinionist with Pupo. In September 2022 Nara became one of the four panelists in the first season of the Argentine talent ¿Quién es la máscara?.

Personal life

Nara was married to Maxi López from 28 May 2008 to 6 November 2013; Nara and López divorced after López accused her of cheating on him, but she accused López of repeated marital infidelity and the Argentine magistrates absolved him from the charge of harassment against their home governess, but she got the public recognition that she was betrayed by her husband. López and Nara have three sons, Valentino Gastón López Nara (born on 25 January 2009), Constantino López Nara (born on 18 December 2010) and Benedicto López Nara (born on 20 February 2012); not long after her divorce Nara, with her sons, left Italy to return to Buenos Aires and began a relationship with Mauro Icardi.

Icardi knew Nara during his friendship with López when they played during the 2012–13 Serie A in the same team: during the April 2014 Serie A match between Lopez's Sampdoria and Icardi's Inter, López notably refused to shake Icardi's hand, leading the international press to dub the game Wanda Derby. Nara and Icardi subsequently married on 27 May 2014, not long after Nara's divorce from the first husband López (which was announced on 6 November 2013) was finalised, with a small ceremony in Buenos Aires and a big wedding party on 7 June 2014 which attracted the attention of the international press. López, in April 2016, repeated the story of Wanda Derby by again refusing to shake his hand during a Serie A match.
Nara and Icardi have two daughters, Francesca Icardi Nara (born on 19 January 2015) and Isabella Icardi Nara (born on 27 October 2016). In addition, she is also Icardi's football agent.

On 16 October 2021, Nara wrote a message on her Instagram story seemingly directed at her husband Icardi. The message said that someone had "ruined another family for a slut". The following day, she left Paris for Milan, the family's former home until 2019, with her five children. Later, the two spouses reconciled, and Nara and her five children returned to live with Icardi. However, Nara announced the end of their marriage almost a year later on 22 September 2022 in Instagram Stories.

Television

References

1986 births
Living people
Argentine expatriates in Italy
Argentine female models
Association footballers' wives and girlfriends
Bailando por un Sueño (Argentine TV series) participants
Participants in Argentine reality television series
People from San Isidro Partido